George Russell Ellison (January 24, 1897 – January 20, 1978) was a Major League Baseball pitcher. On August 21, he came into a game during a doubleheader against the Boston Red Sox, walking two batters and striking out one without allowing a hit or a run.

Sources

1897 births
1978 deaths
Major League Baseball pitchers
Cleveland Indians players
Portland Beavers players
Baseball players from San Francisco
California Golden Bears baseball players